Pro domo may refer to:
pro domo, Latin phrase
 Pro domo, title of a 1918 Dutch silent movie